Twin Lakes is a set of connected lakes at the base of the southeastern slope of Mammoth Mountain, in Mono County of eastern California. They are in the eastern Sierra Nevada, and within the Inyo National Forest.

Twin Lakes are the lowest lakes in the Mammoth Lakes Basin. On one side of the lake are lava cliffs that were formed by eruptions of Mammoth Mountain. The other side of the lake has the Inyo National Forest's Twin Lakes Campground, and Tamarack Lodge of the Mammoth Mountain Ski Area.

See also
 Twin Lakes (Bridgeport, California) – another pair of lakes in Mono County by the same name
 List of lakes in California

References

Lakes of the Sierra Nevada (United States)
Lakes of Mono County, California
Inyo National Forest
Lakes of California
Lakes of Northern California